USS Eastport was a steamer captured by the Union Navy during the American Civil War. She was used by the Union Navy as a convoy and patrol vessel on Confederate waterways.

Captured Confederate schooner used as Union Navy patrol vessel 

Converted into an ironclad ram for use by the Union Army 
Converted at Cairo, Illinois, into an ironclad ram for use by the Union Army, she sailed from that port late in August under the command of Captain Phelps for duty in the Mississippi River between Island No. 10 and the mouth of the White River, Arkansas. She was back at Cairo, Illinois, for repairs when, on 1 October 1862, Eastport and the other vessels of the Western Flotilla were turned over to the Navy and joined the Mississippi Squadron.

Assigned to the Navy’s Mississippi Squadron 
Eastport sailed from Cairo to join her squadron near Vicksburg, Mississippi, but struck bottom on 2 February 1863 and returned to Cairo for repairs. She stood down the river on 19 June for Helena, Arkansas, and served the rest of her career in the Mississippi River and its tributaries as a convoy and patrol vessel, helping capture over 14,000 bales of cotton. On 5 March 1864, she dropped down to the mouth of the Red River for the joint Army-Navy expedition.

Eastport strikes a mine
She passed through the obstructions below Fort De Russy, in whose capture she joined, then continued up the Red River above Grand Ecore until 5 April, when she rounded to and stood down again. On 15 April 1864, she suffered a torpedo (mine) explosion. Despite every effort to bring her out, she had to be destroyed on the 26th to prevent her falling into Confederate hands. Captain Phelps placed 3,000 pounds of gunpowder in her hold and blew the vessel into fragments.

See also

 Blockade runners of the American Civil War
 List of ships of the Confederate States Navy

Citations

Bibliography
 
 
 
 
 

Ships of the Union Navy
Ships built in Illinois
Gunboats of the United States Navy
Steamships of the United States Navy
Shipwrecks of the American Civil War
Ships sunk by mines
Captured ships
Shipwrecks in rivers
Maritime incidents in April 1864